Adin Ballou Capron (January 9, 1841 – March 17, 1911) was an American miller and politician from the U.S. state of Rhode Island. He served in the American Civil War and was a member of the United States House of Representatives.

Early life and military career
Born in Mendon, Massachusetts, Capron attended Woonsocket High School and Westbrook Seminary, near Portland, Maine. He settled in Stillwater, Rhode Island, and engaged in milling and dealing in grain. He enlisted as a sergeant in the 2nd Rhode Island Regiment of the Rhode Island Volunteer Infantry in May 1861. He was promoted to the rank of Sergeant Major on July 11, 1861, and commissioned lieutenant in September 1861.

He served in the Signal Corps until the close of the Civil War, having been commissioned first lieutenant on March 3, 1863, and subsequently promoted to the rank of captain and major by brevet.

Political career
From 1887-1892, Capron served as member of the Rhode Island House of Representatives, and was speaker of the State House in 1891 and 1892. He was an unsuccessful candidate for election in 1892 to the Fifty-third Congress.

Capron was elected as a Republican candidate to the 55th United States Congress and to the six succeeding Congresses, serving in Congress from March 4, 1897, to March 3, 1911. He was not a candidate for renomination in 1910.

After leaving Congress, he resumed his former business activities in Stillwater, where he died March 17, 1911.  He was interred in Swan Point Cemetery in Providence, Rhode Island.

Family life
Capron was the son of Carlile Willis Capron and Abigail (Bates) Capron. He married Irene Ballou in August 1868 and she died ten months later. Following her death, Capron married Phebe Almira Mowry in April 1874. Capron and Phebe had four children: Helen Mowry Capron, John Mowry Capon, Adin Mowry Capon and Almira Mowry Capron.

References

External links 
 Retrieved on 2009-05-01
 
	
	

1841 births
1911 deaths
People from Mendon, Massachusetts
People from Smithfield, Rhode Island
People from Providence County, Rhode Island
Speakers of the Rhode Island House of Representatives
People of Rhode Island in the American Civil War
Republican Party members of the Rhode Island House of Representatives
Westbrook College alumni
Union Army officers
Burials at Swan Point Cemetery
Republican Party members of the United States House of Representatives from Rhode Island
19th-century American politicians
Military personnel from Massachusetts